The Grasshopper Cup is a squash tournament held in Zurich, Switzerland between March and May. It is part of the PSA World Tour. The event has been played since 1979.

Past Results

References

External links
- Official website

Squash tournaments in Switzerland
Sport in Zürich